Leonidas Stergiou (born 3 March 2002) is a Swiss professional footballer who plays as a centre-back for FC St. Gallen.

Club career
Stergiou initially made his competitive debut for the senior St. Gallen side in February 2019, participating in a 3–1 victory against FC Zurich.

International career
Stergiou has played four games for Switzerland U15 and five for Switzerland U16.

Honours
Individual
Swiss Super League Young Footballer of the Year: 2020–21

Personal life
Stergiou was born in Wattwil in the Toggenburg area of Switzerland, to a Serbian mother and a Greek father. The 20-year-old has spent the whole of his life so far in the country of his birth, joining the FC St. Gallen academy at a young age and subsequently progressing through the ranks to the first team.

References

External links
Leonidas Stergiou at St. Gallen's website
Leonidas Stergiou at SFV (U17)

2002 births
Living people
Swiss people of Greek descent
Swiss people of Serbian descent
Sportspeople from the canton of St. Gallen
Swiss men's footballers
Association football defenders
Switzerland under-21 international footballers
Switzerland youth international footballers
Swiss Super League players
FC St. Gallen players